Angoville may refer to:

Angoville, Calvados, a commune in the Calvados département
Angoville-au-Plain, a commune in the Manche département
Angoville-en-Saire, a commune until 1973 when it became a part of Cosqueville
Angoville-sur-Ay, a commune in the Manche département